The town of Hyden is located  east-southeast of Perth, Western Australia in the Shire of Kondinin. Hyden is home to Wave Rock, Mulka's Cave and Hippos Yawn, all popular local tourist attractions.

The traditional owners of the area are the Aboriginal Australian group the Njakinjaki people, who have inhabited the region for thousands of years. The many granite outcrops, land formations, waterways as well as flora and fauna are still culturally significant to them.
 
Sandalwood cutters were thought to be the earliest European visitors in the area.

The land in the surrounding area was opened up for agriculture in the 1920s. A railway was built between Kondinin and Hyden Rock in 1930. The townsite was gazetted in 1932 following demand for land around the railway terminus.

The first wheat crop was harvested in Hyden in 1927.

The Hyden Progress Association was established prior to 1931 when the town was home to about 100 settlers. In 1931 the town had another large wheat crop, which was transported from the railway terminus at Lake Grace. The town was being surveyed and already had an oil depot, tea rooms and an agency with a store being constructed. A large catchment of water had also been built at Hyden Rock.

By 1933 the railway line from Lake Grace to Hyden was completed.

In 1933 the Progress Association built a pavilion at the existing sports ground and plans were made to construct a town hall. The hall was completed prior to 1935.

The town's economy continues to rely on agriculture, mostly in the form of cattle and sheep production that has a current value of approximately $35 million. The town also benefits from mining and tourism.

The surrounding areas produce wheat and other cereal crops. The town is a grain receival site for Cooperative Bulk Handling.

Other visitors arrive during the wildflower season between September and December to see the many wildflower species that bloom at the time and different birds that feed on the blossom.

Wave Rock Wildlife Park
The inhabitants include: koalas, wombats, kangaroos, wallabies, bettongs, possums, alpacas, camels, donkeys and a variety of birds such as emus, owls and swans. Native lizards freely inhabit the park and a cafe is on site for visitors.

References

External links

 Shire of Kondinin

Towns in Western Australia
Grain receival points of Western Australia
Shire of Kondinin